The Meghalaya Pradesh Congress Committee (or Meghalaya PCC) is the unit of the Indian National Congress for the state of Meghalaya, India.
Its head office is situated at the Congress Bhawan, Thana Road in Shillong.
The present President of Meghalaya Pradesh Congress Committee is Vincent Pala.

Meghalaya Legislative Assembly election

Structure and Composition

See also
 Indian National Congress
 Congress Working Committee
 All India Congress Committee
 Pradesh Congress Committee

References

External links

Indian National Congress by state or union territory